Aziz Abdul Muniru is a Ghanaian politician and member of the Seventh Parliament of the Fourth Republic of Ghana representing the Akan Constituency in the Volta Region on the ticket of the National Democratic Congress.

References

Ghanaian MPs 2017–2021
Year of birth missing (living people)
Living people